Haye Farm is a farm in the parish of Callington, Cornwall, England.

See also

 List of farms in Cornwall

References

Farms in Cornwall
Callington